Querrien is a commune in the Finistère department of Brittany in northwestern France.

Population
Inhabitants of Querrien are called in French Querriennois.

Geography

Neighbouring communes

Querrien is border by Lanvénégen to north, by Meslan and Locunolé to east, by Tréméven and Mellac to south and by Saint-Thurien to west.

Map

Breton language
The municipality launched a linguistic plan concerning the Breton language through Ya d'ar brezhoneg on 7 March 2007.

Gallery

See also
Communes of the Finistère department

References

Mayors of Finistère Association

External links

Official website

Communes of Finistère